StarRotor Corporation is a startup company founded to commercialize technology from Texas A&M University. It was incorporated in March 2001 by Dr. Mark Holtzapple and Andrew Rabroker.  The company gets its name and logo design from the gerotor the company designed to compress and expand gasses.

History

Current Products

Compressors

Expanders

Products Under Development

Air Conditioning

StarRotor Engine
The StarRotor engine is being designed to use the Brayton cycle instead of the Otto cycle found in almost all gasoline automobiles. It is predicted to be efficient (45%-60% efficiency compared to 15% to 20% efficiency of other engines) and to produce fewer pollutants than traditional engines. Like turbine engines, the StarRotor engine will be capable of running on many types of fuel, including but not limited to gasoline, kerosene, jet fuel, diesel, alcohol, methane, hydrogen, and vegetable oil.

Integrated Motors/Generators

See also
www.starrotor.com, Company website
Sustainable Energy and Transportation, April 25, 2006 Texas A&M lecture by Dr. Holtzapple
The race to 100 mpg, July 2007 article mentioning the StarRotor engine

References

Texas A&M University
Companies based in Bryan, Texas